The Wijewardene family is a Sri Lankan family that is prominent in enterprise and politics. Along with many members who have been successful politician across generations, the family includes two Chief Justices, two Prime Ministers and two Presidents of Sri Lanka. In 2000 The siblings went to multiple different countries such as USA, UAE, U.K, New Zealand & Etc. The family decided to establish the main headquarters in Christchurch, New Zealand. The Ownership went to the Oldest Brothers son Aakash Wijewardene in 15/11/2021. The family currently owns an estimated 40 companies worth around $2.1 Billion

History
Tudugalage Don Phillip Wijewardene gained success as a timber merchant having established the Sedawatte Mills, after moving to his mother's village of Sedawatte near the banks of the Kelani river which was used to transport timber. He became a supplier of timber, bricks and sand to public works and the military undertakings of the colonial government and invested in real estate. He was awarded the title of Muhandiram and took the name of Wijewardene at the turn of the century. His sons continued his business ventures, with Don Richard Wijewardena branching out into print media having established Associated Newspapers of Ceylon Limited. After it was nationalized by Sirimavo Bandaranaike's government, Don Richard Wijewardena's son, Ranjith Wijewardene established Wijeya Newspapers in 1979. In 2000 The siblings went to multiple different countries such as USA, UAE, U.K, New Zealand & Etc. The family decided to establish the main headquarters in Christchurch, New Zealand. The Ownership went to the Oldest Brothers son Aakash Wijewardene in 15/11/2021. The family currently owns an estimated 40 companies worth around $2.1 Billion

Family Tree
 Tudugalage Muhandiram Don Phillip Wijeywardene - Muhandiram + Dona Helena Dep Weerasinghe
 Don Richard Wijewardena (1886–1950) + Alice Meedeniya
 Ranjith Wijewardene + Ranjani Senanayake (of the Senanayake family)
 Ruwan Wijewardene (1975- ), Member of Parliament, Cabinet Minister
 Irushi Wijewardene (1972-) + Shastha Bulathsinhala 
 Shakun Bulathsinhala (2002-)
 Nalini Wijewardene + Esmond Wickremesinghe
 Shan Wickremasinghe (1947- ), Founder of Sri Lankan television
 Ranil Wickremasinghe (1949- ), President of Sri Lanka, Prime Minister of Sri Lanka, Government Minister, Member of Parliament
 Rani Wijewardene + George Gomes
Shalini Gomes + Themiya Loku Bandara Hurulle, Member of Parliament, Project Minister (Science and Technology)
 Seewali Wijewardene + Siri Wijewardene 
 Rohan Wijewardene
 Varini Wijewardene + Tony Anghie
 Anil Wijewardene + Shyama Fernando
Saskia Wijewardene
Aquinne Wijewardene
 Kusuma Wijewardene + Lal Gooneratne
 Ayoma Gooneratne
 Arjun Gooneratne 
 Amitha Gonneratne 
 Arushi Gooneratne
 Don Charles Wijewardene (1893-1956) + Vimala Wijewardene, Member of Parliament, Minister of Health
 Padmini Wijewardene
 Rukmani Wijewardene + C Beligammana
 Sarojini Beligammana + Asanga Weerakoon
 Rayshan Weerakoon
 Leonie Weerakoon
 Ananda Wijewardene
 Don Walter T Wijewardene (1894–1939) + Anula Kalyanawathi Wijesinghe
 Upali Wijewardene (1938–1983) + Lakmini Ratwatte
 Kalyani Wijewardene (193?+2010) + Dr Gamini Attygalle, FRCS (brother of General Sepala Attygalle)
 Sudhammika Attygalle
 Anoja Devi Wijewardene (1933-2014) + Prof Stanley Wijesundera (1923 -1989)
 Rohan Wijesundera
 Shalitha Wijesundera, Member of the Western Provincial Council
 Deepthi Wijesundera
 Lakmini Wijesundera
 Don Phillip Alexander Wijewardene + Neeva Hulugalle
 Iranganie Wijewardene + Donald Joseph Wijewardene
 Nelun Kumari Wijewardene + William Tissa "Tommy" Ellawala
 Amari Wijewardene, Ambassador to the United Kingdom
 Dr Don Edmund Wijewardene + Dr Corin Amanda Jennings 
 Dr Phillip Revatha "Ray" Wijewardene - Chancellor University of Moratuwa + Seela de Mel 
 Anoma Wijewardene
Roshini Wijewardene  
Mandy Wijewardene
 Pamela Manel Wijewardene + Vernon Wijetunga, QC
 Agnes Helen Wijewardene + Eugene Wilfred Jayewardene (1874–1932), Chief Justice
 Junius Richard Jayewardene (1906–1996), President of Sri Lanka, Prime Minister of Sri Lanka, Government Minister, Member of Parliament, Member of State Council
 Hector Wilfred Jayewardene (1916–1990)
 Don Luis Wijewardene + Muriel Godamunne
 Donald Joseph Wijewardene + Iranganie Wijewardene
 Nelun Kumari Wijewardene + William Tissa "Tommy" Ellawala
 Amari Wijewardene - Ambassador to the United Kingdom
 Semitha Wijewardene + Victor Tennekoon, Chief Justice
Dayanthi Tennekoon + Dayantha Athulathmudali
Aakash Wijewardene (2007 - Present), Current Owner all of Enterprises

Other members of the family include;
 Sir Henry De Mel
 J. H. Meedeniya Adigar

See also
List of political families in Sri Lanka

References